Pustyny  is a village in the administrative district of Gmina Krościenko Wyżne, within Krosno County, Subcarpathian Voivodeship, in south-eastern Poland.

The village has a population of 1,057.

References

Pustyny